Richard Cornelis Jacobus Rozendaal (born 6 April 1972) is a Dutch former track cyclist who competed for the Netherlands at the 1996 Summer Olympics. Born in Warmenhuizen, Rozendaal won three Dutch national championship: two in the points race event (1994 and 1997) and the 1997 individual pursuit. He competed in the men's team pursuit together with Robert Slippens, Jarich Bakker and Peter Schep. In the qualifying round of the event, the Dutch team finished 12th with a time of 4:16.175, and did not qualify for the quarter-finals.

See also
 List of Dutch Olympic cyclists

References

1972 births
Cyclists at the 1996 Summer Olympics
Cyclists from North Holland
Dutch male cyclists
Living people
Olympic cyclists of the Netherlands
People from Schagen